is both the southernmost and westernmost of the national highways of Japan. It connects Ishigaki, Okinawa on Ishigaki Island, to Miyako-jima, and Naha, Okinawa on Okinawa Island in Japan.

Route description
National Route 390 features the 730 Intersection in Ishigaki, a monument to the day when traffic in Okinawa Prefecture was reverted from driving on the right-hand side of the road to the left after the United States relinquished control over the prefecture to Japan following the 1971 Okinawa Reversion Agreement.

See also

References

External links

390
Roads in Okinawa Prefecture